The Promise: President Obama, Year One is a book by Jonathan Alter describing US President Barack Obama's first year in office. In The Promise, Alter describes the many challenges the Obama administration faced in its first year: a troubled economy, passing health care reform, and the War in Afghanistan. Alter discusses the ability of the White House to avoid another Great Depression and accomplish many of Obama's campaign promises, yet still fail to effectively communicate their impact to the American public.

Notes and references

External links
 The author's page for his book on his personal website
 Amazon Listing for The Promise

2010 non-fiction books
Books about politics of the United States
Books about the Obama administration